Club Nacional de Football, commonly known as simply Nacional, is the basketball section of the Club Nacional de Football club, based in Montevideo, Uruguay. The men's first team plays professionally in the Liga Uruguaya de Básquetbol.

Home games of the team are played in the Polideportivo Gran Parque Central, where there is capacity for 400 people. Nacional participates in the tournaments organised by the Uruguayan basketball federation Federación Uruguaya de Basketball (known as FUBB) since 1932. The club won the championships of 1935 and 1937. Nowadays, Nacional takes part in the Liga Uruguaya de Basketball, Uruguayan basketball first division.

Honours

 Uruguay Federal Championship
Champions (2): 1935, 1937
Liga Uruguaya de Básquetbol
Runners-up (1): 2021
 Liguilla
Champions (2): 1982, 1983

Players

Current roster

Notable players

 Quincy Miller (1 season: 2021–present)
 Johndre Jefferson (1 season: 2021–present)

References

Basketball teams in Uruguay
Basketball teams established in 1930
Club Nacional de Football